Greg van Hest (born June 4, 1973 in Tilburg) is a Dutch runner.

Career highlights

Dutch National Championships
1996 - Schoorl, 1st, 10 km
1997 - Schoorl, 1st, 10 km
1999 - The Hague, 1st, Half marathon
1999 - 1st, Cross-country
2000 - The Hague, 1st, Half marathon
2008 - Eindhoven, 1st, Marathon

Other achievements
1998 - Tilburg, 4th, Tilburg 10 Miles 'my city'
1999 - Tilburg, 3rd, Tilburg 10 Miles 'my city'
2000 - Tilburg, 2nd, Tilburg 10 Miles 'my city'
2000 - Sydney, 102nd, Olympics 
2011 & 2014 - Tilburg, 1st, Kruikenloop
2011 & 2014 - Oisterwijk, 1st, Vennenloop
2012 - Berkel-Enschot, 1st, Galgenloop

Personal bests

* = with Simon Vroemen, Gerald Kappert, Henk Gommer and René Godlieb.

External links
Official website
Atletiekunie profile

1973 births
Living people
Dutch male long-distance runners
Dutch male marathon runners
Athletes (track and field) at the 2000 Summer Olympics
Olympic athletes of the Netherlands
Sportspeople from Tilburg
20th-century Dutch people
21st-century Dutch people